Man o' War was a thoroughbred racehorse considered an all-time great.

Man o' War (or capitalization variations thereof) may also refer to:

Animals
 Portuguese man o' war, a floating marine animal found in the Atlantic that resembles a jellyfish
 Man o' war, alternate name for the magnificent frigatebird

Places
 Man O' War Bay (disambiguation)
 Man-O-War Cay, an island in the Bahamas

Other uses
 Man-of-war (aka Man o' war), a heavily armed warship from the 16th to the 19th centuries
 Man-O-War GFC, a Gaelic football club
 Manowar, a heavy metal band
 Man o' War Boulevard, Lexington, Kentucky, U.S.
 Man o' War, a former Central of Georgia passenger train operating from Atlanta to Columbus, Georgia
 Man O' War (game), a naval wargame by Games Workshop
 Man O' War, a brand of cigar manufactured by A. J. Fernandez Cigars
 Gigabolt Man-O-War, a boss character in the video game Mega Man X8

See also
 Justin Credible, former WWF wrestler who went by the name "Aldo Montoya, the Portuguese Man O' War"
 Man of war (disambiguation)
 Men of war (disambiguation)